The β3 (beta 3) adrenergic receptor agonist or β3-adrenoceptor agonist, also known as β3-AR agonist, are a class of medicine that bind selectively to β3-adrenergic receptors.

β3-AR agonists for the treatment of obesity and type 2 diabetes have been in developmental stages within many large pharmaceutical companies since the early 1990s without successfully delivering an anti-obesity product to the market. More recently pharmaceutical companies have developed selective β3-AR agonists targeted at urinary inconsistencies and in 2012 Mirabegron (trade name Myrbetriq and Betmiga) was the first β3-AR agonist to be approved in the United States and Europe for the treatment of overactive bladder (OAB) syndrome.

Medical Uses 
In 2018 only one β3-AR agonist is approved by the European Medicines Agency (EMA) and the Food and drug Administration (FDA) as a medicine. The medicine is called Mirabegron and is used to treat OAB.

Urinary bladder 

Mirabegron is a selective β3-AR agonist that affects the detrusor muscles of the urinary bladder. By stimulation of β3-AR the contraction of the smooth muscles of the bladder is decreased and the bladder can store more volume of urine at a given time. Mirabegron also has an influence on the non-voiding contraction by decreasing the frequency of the contractions.  

In 2018 two other β3-AR agonists are in clinical trials, vibegron and solabegron. Vibegron is in phase 3 clinical trial and is used to treat OAB. Solabegron is in phase 2b clinical trials to treat OAB in women and in phase 1 clinical trials in men to treat OAB.

Obesity and diabetes 
The β3-AR has been linked to thermogenesis in human skeletal muscles, with studies showing it to be responsible for over 40% of ephedrine-induced thermogenesis.

Cardiovascular 
In March 2016 a study funded by the European Commission began. The study is assessing the efficacy of Mirabegron in prevention of heart failure. In 2018 the study is ongoing and it's expected to conclude in 2020.

A selective β1-AR antagonist with additional β3-AR agonist activity, called nebivolol, is one of a few selective B1-AR antagonists known to also cause vasodilation. This peripheral vasodilation is mediated by endothelial nitric oxide release following β3-AR agonism, not by adrenergic receptor blockade. This means nebivolol exerts vasodilatory, cardioprotective effects without the added adrenergic block side effects seen with non-selective beta-blockers that concomitantly lower blood pressure. Nebivolol is therefore approved for hypertension therapy in the United States; however, beta-blockers are still not generally the first line of treatment for primary hypertension.

Mechanism of action 
β3-AR are coupled with G proteins, both Gs protein and Gi protein. Gs protein coupled with β3-AR lead to increased activity of the enzyme adenylyl cyclase. Increased activity of adenylyl cyclase leads to increased formation of cyclic adenosine monophosphate (cAMP).

β3-AR can also couple with Gi proteins. When they are coupled they lead to decrease in intracellular cAMP. The mechanism of β3-AR and Gi protein has been proposed as a mechanism of action in the heart. When β3-AR are coupled with Gi protein they can act as a brake on β1- and β2 adrenergic receptors to prevent over-activation by opposing the classical inotropic effect of β1 and β2 adrenergic receptors.

The smooth muscle cells in the urinary bladder express β3-AR. They have effect on the detrusor muscle which relaxes when the β3-AR are activated. The relaxed detrusor muscle improves filling capacity of the bladder and eases the urge to pass urine.

Nitric oxide 
Another mechanism by which β3-AR agonists exert their relaxative effects on vasculature is by promoting endothelial nitric oxide synthase (eNOS) activity and NO bioavailability. This is believed to be the mechanism by which nebivolol, a selective β1-AR antagonist with additional β3-AR agonist activity, exerts its cardio-protective effects.

Structure Activity Relationships (SAR)

Basic structure of β3-adrenergic receptor agonists 
β3-AR agonists have the basic structure 2-amino-1-phenylethan-1-ol but have variations that affect the selectivity of the agonist.

Binding to the β3-adrenergic receptor 
Visual inspection of selective β3-AR agonists revealed that they bind deep in the binding pocket of the receptors and exhibit some H-bonds and or hydrophobic interactions with the receptor.

Activity of β3-adrenergic receptor agonists 

The R-group on the following picture determines α- or β-adrenergic receptor selectivity. The larger the R-group is, the greater the β-receptor selectivity.

The basic structure of  β-AR subtypes exhibit sequence similarity greater than 70% suggesting that the 3-dimensional structure of theses subtypes is similar. While the overall structure sequence is 70% identical the residue sites of the ligand binding pocket have an even higher similarity (75%-85%), making development of highly selective ligands difficult. The β3-AR unlike other β-adrenergic receptors has a higher affinity to ligands with a pyrimidine or m-chlorobenzyl ring rather than catecholamine like the other beta receptors subtypes.

Noticeable ligand binding sites are the hydrophobic interaction of the aromatic ring, attached to the β-hydroxyl chiral carbon on the left-hand-side, to hydrophobic microdomains on TM3 and TM6 deep in the binding pocket. Additional hydrophobic side groups attached on this aromatic ring have been shown to increase hydrophobic contact in this region. The central hydroxyl group and the central protonated amine form strong hydrogen bonds with the TM7 and TM3 subunits. The hydrogen bonding of the central protonated amine to Y336 on the TM7 of the β3-AR serves as an important binding site for the ligand, aligning it properly for the deeper hydrophobic interaction between LHS aromatic ring and TM3 and TM6. This interaction is consistent between the ligands.

Most of the selective agonists have an aromatic ring formation or another hydrophobic region, around 2-3 carbons from the central protonated amine group, which interacts with the superficial extracellular (ELC2) domain on the receptor. The stereochemistry of this aromatic group and its interactions with the ECL2 affect the ability of the ligand to align properly in the deep binding pocket and is an important factor for the total affinity of the ligand.

The addition of a proton donating group (e.g. acid, amide) on the right-hand-side terminus contributes to a strong bifurcated hydrogen bonding to the R315 of  TM6. Those ligands that do not have an acidic group have some other form of strong hydrogen bonding group that interacts with R315, such as a thiazole. This binding site differs between the different beta receptors subtypes and contributes to the β3 selectivity.

History of development 
In 1984 the β3 receptor was described as the third group of beta receptors in adipose tissue. This led to the development of agonist targeted at obesity and diabetes.

In 1999 the function of the β3 in detrusor muscles was defined which opened the way for development of β3-AR agonist for OAB.

In 2001 Mirabegron began clinical development in phase 1 clinical study. The indications were type 2 diabetes, lower urinary tract symptoms, OAB and bladder outlet obstruction.

From 2004 to 2008 phase 2 clinical trials were performed. However the development of Mirabegron for type two diabetes was interrupted.

In 2007 GlaxoSmithKline entered phase 1 clinical trials with Solabegron with the indication for OAB as well as a trial with the indication for Irritable bowel syndrome (IBS).

From 2009 to 2011 Astellas Pharma concluded phase 3 clinical trials for the treatment of OAB with mirabegron. In July 2012 mirabegron was the first β3-AR agonist to be approved by the FDA and in October the same year it was approved by EMA.

In 2011 Merck & Co. entered clinical trials with vibegron with the indication for OAB. and phase III clinical trials began in 2018.

In 2018 solabegron, which has been acquired by Velicept Therapeutics, Inc., started phase I and phase II clinical trials in men and women, respectively, for the indication of OAB.

See also 

 Beta-adrenergic agonist
 Beta2-adrenergic agonist

References